Katie Rolfsen (10 November 1902 – 22 September 1966) was a Norwegian-Swedish film actress. She appeared in 25 films between 1925 and 1965. She was born in Oslo, Norway and died in Rådmansö, Sweden.

Selected filmography
 Himmeluret (1925)
 Black Rudolf (1928)
 Colourful Pages (1931)
 The Women Around Larsson (1934)
 65, 66 and I (1936)
 Russian Flu (1937)
 Oh, Such a Night! (1937)
 Julia jubilerar (1938)
 Just a Bugler (1938)
 His Majesty Must Wait (1945)
 Sju svarta be-hå (1954)
 Congress in Seville (1955)
 Docking the Boat (1965)

References

External links
 

1902 births
1966 deaths
Swedish film actresses
Norwegian film actresses
Norwegian silent film actresses
Swedish silent film actresses
Actresses from Oslo
20th-century Swedish actresses
20th-century Norwegian actresses